Goiatuba is a municipality in south-central Goiás state, Brazil.  The population was 34,202 (2020 IBGE) in a total area of 2,470.3 km2.  Goiatuba is a large producer of grains, especially soybeans and corn.

Climate and Location
The average elevation is 775 meters, with an annual temperature average of 22 °C.  The climate is typically tropical, moist and hot, with well-defined dry and rainy seasons.  Average temperatures vary between 19 °C and 30 °C.

Goiatuba is about 50 kilometers north of the Paranaíba River, which forms the boundary with the state of Minas Gerais.  It is 10 kilometers from the important interstate highway BR-153, which links Itumbiara with the state capital, Goiânia.  The distance to Goiânia is 176 kilometers.

Municipal boundaries are:
North: Vicentinópolis and Joviânia; 
Northeast and East: Morrinhos and Buriti Alegre; 
South: Itumbiara and Panamá 
Southwest: Castelândia and Bom Jesus de Goiás; 
West and Northwest: Porteirão and Edéia
Districts: Marcianópolis.
Hamlets: Rochelândia, Santo Antônio, Serrinha and Venda Seca.

Demographics
Population density:  12.62 inhabitants/km2 (2007)
Population growth rate 1996/2007: 0.04.%
Total population: 31,225
Total population: 26,937
Urban population in 2007: 28,548    
Rural population in 2007: 2,677

Economy
The economy is based on agriculture and cattle raising, but Goiatuba has several large enterprises.  The areas are diverse:  poultry processing, automobile sales, dairy products, and agricultural equipment.  There is an alcohol distillery—Goiasa (Goiatuba Álcool ltda.), a seed producer—Sementes Selecta, a bed clothing factory—Bouquet, a dairy—Laticínio Polenghi (which produces most of the ice cream sold by McDonald's in Brazil), and two fertilizer plants—Adubos Sul Goiano, Adubos Terra Verde.

Economic data
Industrial units: 55 (06/2007)
Retail units: 413 (08/2007)
Banking institutions: Banco do Brasil S.A. - BRADESCO S.A. - Banco Itaú S.A. - CEF - Banco ABN AMRO Real S.A. - HSBC Bank Brasil S.A.-Banco Multiplo.. (01/06/2005)

Industrial Dairies

Polenghi Indústrias Alimentícias Ltda.; 
Goiatuba Álcool S/A(GOIASA);
Bom Sucesso Agroindústria Ltda.;
LogSeed Sementes Ltda.;
Sementes Magnólia Ltda.;
Agrex do Brasil S/A;
Globoaves São Paulo Agroavícola Ltda.;
São Salvador Alimentos S/A - ; 
Frangoiano Indústria de Alimentos S/A - ;
AgroBom Armazéns Gerais Ltda.;
Gaia Agribusiness Armazéns Gerais Ltda.
AgroBom Armazéns Gerais Ltda.;
Industrial Park: Distrito Agroindustrial - DIAGO;

Main agricultural activities
Cattle raising: 98,100 head (2006)
Poultry: 301,000
Agriculture:  rice, sugarcane (13,000 hectares), sorghum, soybeans (62,000 hectares), and corn (10,750 hectares).  There is modest production of  citrus fruits, bananas, manioc, beans, and tomatoes.  Statistics are from IBGE 
Number of farms:                745
Total area:                  152,077 
Area of permanent crops:        991
Area of perennial crops:     71,500
Area of natural pasture:     56,773 
Persons dependent on farming: 2,500 IBGE

Education and health
Literacy rate: 88.8%
Infant mortality rate: 13.30 in 1,000 live births
Schools: 24 (2006)
Students: 9,253
Higher education: Faculdade de Filosofia e Ciências Humanas de Goiatuba- FAFICH  - Pólo Universitário da UEG.
Hospitals: 03 (2006)
Hospital beds: 139
(Sepin/IBGE)

Political information
Mayor: Reinaldo Cândido da Silva (January 2013)
City council: 9

Prosperity
The municipality is one of the most prosperous in the state.  Goiatuba got a score of 0.812 on the UN Human Development Index, putting it in 4th place out of 242 municipalities in the state. Nationally it was ranked 350 out of 5,507 municipalities.  For the complete list see Frigoletto

Origin of the name
Goiatuba became a city in 1931, and the origin of the name is curious:  "Goia" comes from the Goia Indians and "Tuba" is a Tupi-Guarani word meaning  "big". So, Goiatuba is the same as "big Goiás".

History
The settlement of the region took place in 1860 when ranchers from Minas Gerais settled to raise cattle and grow crops.  In 1892 land was donated to establish a town.  The first name was "Bananeiras" because of the abundance of this fruit in the region.  With the building of the first chapel the town was called São Sebastião das Bananeiras.  In 1900 it was elevated to a district and became a municipality in 1931.

See also 
 List of municipalities in Goiás

References

Frigoletto
Prefeitura Municipal de Goiatuba

Municipalities in Goiás